Óscar Ignacio Rangel Miravete (born 27 March 1957) is a Mexican politician from the Institutional Revolutionary Party. In 2012 he served as Deputy of the LXI Legislature of the Mexican Congress representing Guerrero. fue subdirector académico de la Universidad del Valle  de México, secretario de desarrollo económico y planeación del municipio de Acapulco, secretario De desarrollo social del mismo municipio, Diputado local de la 56 legislatura al congreso del estado de Guerrero, Delegado federal del RAM Diputado federal y secretario del trabajo y previsión Social del gobierno del estado de Guerrero

References

 actualmente secretario del trabajo y previsión social del Estado de Guerrero

1957 births
Living people
Politicians from Guerrero
Institutional Revolutionary Party politicians
21st-century Mexican politicians
Members of the Congress of Guerrero
Deputies of the LXI Legislature of Mexico
Members of the Chamber of Deputies (Mexico) for Guerrero